Early Music is a peer-reviewed academic journal specialising in the study of early music. It was established in 1973 and is published quarterly by Oxford University Press. The co-editors are Helen Deeming, Alan Howard and Stephen Rose.

History
Early Musics founder was John Mansfield Thomson, an eminent New Zealand musicologist who worked for many decades in London, where he was a leading figure at the beginning of the early music revival. Through Baroque Concerts, his concert promotion agency, he brought major performers of early music to London in the late 1960s. Among the musicians were Gustav Scheck (flute and treble recorder) and Walter Bergmann (basso continuo and harpsichord) whose concert at the Purcell Room in January 1968 included works by Loeillet de Gant and Leonardi Vinci. Thomson was music editor at Barrie and Jenkins and at Faber & Faber, and he worked briefly with Benjamin Britten at Aldeburgh. Thomson's relationship with Oxford University Press was not easy and he described control of the magazine by the music department as "spiritual death". Thomson died in Wellington, New Zealand on 11 September 1999. An obituary in the Guardian noted "how music was only a cover for what really interested him; meeting artistic and creative personalities, finding material for his own writing and design work". Thomson imposed excellence and elegance in design when Early Music was launched, and was painstaking during more than a decade as editor in ensuring that high standards were met in all phases of publication. Thomson left his papers, with its index running to about 70 pages, to the library of Waikato University in New Zealand.

References

English-language journals
Quarterly journals
Music journals
Publications established in 1973
Oxford University Press academic journals